Jean Mézard (1904-1997) was a French physician and politician. He served as a member of the French Senate from 1971 to 1980, representing Cantal.

References

1904 births
1997 deaths
People from Lot (department)
People from Aurillac
French Senators of the Fifth Republic
Senators of Cantal
Mayors of places in Auvergne-Rhône-Alpes